Emmanuel da Silva, better known as Da Silva (born in Nevers on 15 April 1976), is a French singer-songwriter of Portuguese descent. A Le Monde critic called him a musical chameleon passing from punk and industrial to electro, garage, and rock.

In his adolescence, he was part of the punk group Mad Coakroches and later formed his own band Punishment Park. At 21, he moved to more acoustic sounds with the group.

He resided for about two years in Dinan in Côtes-d'Armor, an area that has been a source of inspiration for Da Silva. He recorded his first two self-financed albums in the local Théâtre des Jacobins. After Dinan, Da Silva moved to Rennes, where he created his own home studio.

With help from Cali, who invited him to open up for some of his concerts, he released the album Décembre en été in 2005 that sold 110,000 copies and included the folk style single "L'Indécision". What followed was a more melancholic pessimistic album in 2007 titled De beaux jours à venir on his take on life in general.

La Tendresse des fous in 2009 became his most successful commercial album that reached the French Top 20, followed by La distance in 2012 and Villa Rosa in 2013.

Discography

Albums

Singles
2005: ""L'Indécision"

References

External links
Official website
Facebook

1976 births
Living people
People from Nevers
French people of Portuguese descent
21st-century French singers
21st-century French male singers